Boris Krčmar (born 13 September 1979) is a Croatian professional steel-tip and soft-tip darts player who currently plays in the Professional Darts Corporation (PDC) events. He dominated soft-tip darts for over decade and won more than 400 professional soft-tip tournaments. He is a four-time IDF World Champion, nine-time EDF European Champion, eight-time EDU European Champion and FECS European Champion. He was the first Croatian player to qualify for the PDC World Darts Championship.

Career
Boris Krčmar is an accomplished soft-tip darts player and won the IDF World Championship in 2009, 2011, 2013 and 2015. He started his career in 2005 and from 2007 to present he was the winner of more than 400 official and unofficial tournaments in soft tip darts. From 2007 to present he is the captain of the Croatian national team. Krčmar qualified for the 2011 PDC World Darts Championship by winning the Eastern European qualifier. In the preliminary round, he lost 4–2 to Denmark's Per Laursen.

He qualified for the 2012 PDC World Cup of Darts where he partnered Tonci Restovic in the Croatian team. After defeating Finland in the first round, they faced Wales in the second round. In his singles match, Krčmar forced Richie Burnett into a last leg decider before losing 4–3. In April, Krčmar earned a place in the Austrian Darts Open in Vienna by defeating Kurt van de Rijck and Antonio Alcinas in the European qualifier. He played Wes Newton in the first round and lost 6–4.

Krčmar had a very good year in soft tip events in 2014 by winning the Chinese and Las Vegas Dartslive events. He came very close to reaching his second World Championship when he lost in the final of the East European Qualifier for the 2015 edition 10–7 against Robert Marijanović.

On 19 January 2020, Krčmar won a two-year PDC Tour Card by finishing sixth on the European Q School Order of Merit. He will play on the ProTour in 2020 and 2021. He withdrew from 2020 UK Open due to a prior commitment. The only major tournament he qualified was 2020 Players Championship Finals, where he lost in the first round against Michael Smith 5-6. 

Krcmar entered Eastern European Qualifier for 2021 PDC World Darts Championship and secured his return to this tournament after 10 years. He lost in the first round to Ron Meulenkamp 1-3 on sets. He again withdrew from 2021 UK Open prior to the draw and was replaced. During 2021 Krcmar made his debut on European Tour, qualifying for the both events that took place and therefore also qualifying for 2021 European Championsihp, where he lost in the first round to Michael van Gerwen 2-6. Croatia were set to return to 2021 PDC World Cup of Darts, having not participated in the competition since 2013, but on 7 September, Croatia withdrew following an illness to Boris Krčmar. Later on in the year Krcmar won qualification for 2021 Grand Slam of Darts and was drawn to group C with James Wade, Rob Cross and Jim Williams. Unable to win any match in the group stage, he was eliminated after the round robin. 

For the second time in a row Boris qualified for 2022 PDC World Darts Championship, this time via PDPA Qualifier. He lost in the first round of the main event to Adam Hunt 0-3 on sets but was able to hold his place in top 64 of the PDC Order of Merit and secured his Tour card for another year.

Krcmar made his debut on 2022 UK Open and received bye to the third round of the event. After wins over Zoran Lerchbacher 6-2, Luke Woodhouse 10-5 and Dave Chisnall 10-4, Boris advanced among last 16, where he lost 8-10 to James Wade. During 2022 Krcmar qualified for four European Tour events and achieved his best result so far on 2022 Dutch Darts Championship, where he played quarterfinals. Krcmar was unable to qualify for any other major event that year but secured his spot on 2023 PDC World Darts Championship via PDC Pro Tour, where he finished on 24th place.

World Championship results

PDC
 2011: Preliminary round (lost to Per Laursen 2–4) (legs)
 2021: First round (lost to Ron Meulenkamp 1–3) (sets)
 2022: First round (lost to Adam Hunt 0–3) (sets)
 2023: Second round (lost to Nathan Aspinall 1–3) (sets)

Performance timeline

PDC

PDC European Tour

(W) Won; (F) finalist; (SF) semifinalist; (QF) quarterfinalist; (#R) rounds 6, 5, 4, 3, 2, 1; (RR) round-robin stage; (Prel.) Preliminary round; (DNQ) Did not qualify; (DNP) Did not participate; (NH) Not held; (EX) Excluded; (WD) Withdrew

References

External links

Professional Darts Corporation current tour card holders
Croatian darts players
Living people
1979 births
PDC World Cup of Darts Croatian team